The 13th Rhythmic Gymnastics Asian Championships and the 18th Junior Asian Gymnastics Championships were held in Pattaya, Thailand from June 23 to 26, 2022.

Medal winners

Senior

Junior

Medal table

Overall

References

Rhythmic Gymnastics Asian Championships
Gymnastics competitions in Thailand
International gymnastics competitions hosted by Thailand
2022 in gymnastics
Sports competitions in Pattaya
2022 in Thai sport
June 2022 sports events in Thailand